Ravinder Singh Brahampura is an Indian politician from the state of Punjab.

Constituency
Brahmpura represented the Khadoor Sahib Assembly Constituency of Punjab.

Political Party  
Brahmpura had left Shiromani Akali Dal in 2018 along with other members and joined Shiromani Akali Dal (Taksali) which later merged into Shiromani Akali Dal (Sanyukt). In December 2021, he along with his father Ranjit Singh Brahmpura and other members of Shiromani Akali Dal (Sanyukt) rejoined Shiromani Akali Dal.

References 

People from Punjab, India
Shiromani Akali Dal politicians
Living people
Year of birth missing (living people)
Shiromani Akali Dal (Taksali) politicians